Soi is the term used in Thailand for a side-street branching off a major street (thanon). An alley is called a trok.

Overview
Sois are usually numbered, and are referred to by the name of the major street and the number, as in "Soi Sukhumvit 4", "Sukhumvit Soi 4", or "Sukhumvit 4", all referring to the fourth soi of Sukhumvit Road in Bangkok. When walking on the major street towards increasing soi numbers, all the even-numbered sois are on the right side and the odd-numbered ones on the left side of the street. If for instance a new soi is added between soi 7 and soi 9 it will get the number soi 7/1, the next one soi 7/2, etc. It is also possible that soi 20 is far away from soi 21 if there are more sois on one side of the street than on the other.

While sois are commonly referred to by number, almost all sois in Bangkok also have a name. On lower Sukhumvit road in Bangkok, for instance, the sois are named after important landowners or families of landowners who had land in the area in the past. Some sois become major thoroughfares and because of that get known by their name only. Examples are Asok (Soi Sukhumvit 21), Thong Lo (Soi Sukhumvit 55), Ekkamai (Soi Sukhumvit 63), Pridi Banomyong (Soi Sukhumvit 71), etc.

Sois can themselves have sois branching off them, for example Thong Lo Soi 4 is the 4th soi branching off Thong Lo, itself the 55th soi branching off Sukhumvit Road.

The houses in a soi are numbered. If a new house is inserted after the house with number 150 for instance, it will get the number 150/1, etc. A formal address might read "150/1 Soi Sukhumvit 7", referring to the house with the first number after 150 in the seventh soi of Sukhumvit Road. The house numbers in most sois don't start at 1, but continue the house numbers of the main street.

References 

Thai words and phrases
Streets in Thailand